Eden (2014) is a crime novel by Australian author Candice Fox. It won the Ned Kelly Award in 2015 for Best Novel. The novel follows Eden Archer, a policewoman and serial killer who is on the trail of a killer targeting prostitutes.

Reviews

Sue Turnbull from The Sydney Morning Herald stated: "This is crime fiction informed not so much by the literary past of the genre, as by television's Dexter and Breaking Bad, the ironically violent films of Quentin Tarantino and the graphic novels of Frank Miller."

Awards and nominations

 2015 longlisted Davitt Award — Best Adult Crime Novel 
 2015 winner Ned Kelly Awards — Best Novel

References

2014 Australian novels
Australian crime novels
Ned Kelly Award-winning works
Random House books